Ahmed Mazen Mohammed Al-Sughair (born September 27, 1991) is a Jordanian professional footballer who plays as a defender for Al-Faisaly.

References

External links 

ahliclubjo.org

Association football defenders
Living people
Al-Ahli SC (Amman) players
1991 births
Jordanian footballers
Al-Jazeera (Jordan) players